Lovers is an album by jazz saxophonist Cannonball Adderley. It was recorded at Fantasy Studios in Berkeley, California in 1975 by Adderley with Nat Adderley, Alvin Batiste, George Duke, Alphonso Johnson, Jack DeJohnette, Airto Moreira. A posthumously released track included Flora Purim, Nat Adderley Jr., and Ron Carter.

Reception
The Allmusic review by Scott Yanow awarded the album 1½ stars and states: "This particular LP was already more than half completed with Adderley taking his last solos on three of the selections... but unfortunately none of the music is all that memorable.... After Cannonball's death 'Lovers' (which had been planned for the album) was recorded as a memorial.... The intentions were honorable but the music is pretty forgettable."

Track listing
 "Nascente" (Hermeto Pascoal) - 6:03
 "New Orleans Strut" (Jack DeJohnette) -  4:33
 "Children of Time" (George Duke) - 3:39
 "Ayjala" (Alvin Batiste) - 7:03
 "Salty Dogs" (Batiste) - 7:28
 "Lovers" (Nat Adderley Jr.) - 11:39

Personnel
 Cannonball Adderley – alto saxophone, soprano saxophone
 Nat Adderley – cornet
 Alvin Batiste – clarinet, flute, tenor saxophone
 George Duke – electric piano, synthesizers, vocals
 Nat Adderley Jr. – electric piano
 Alphonso Johnson – bass guitar
 Ron Carter – double bass
 Jack DeJohnette – drums
 Airto Moreira – percussion
 Flora Purim – vocals

References

1976 albums
Fantasy Records albums
Cannonball Adderley albums
Nat Adderley albums
Albums produced by Orrin Keepnews